USS Katydid (SP-95) was an armed motorboat that served in the United States Navy as a patrol vessel from 1917 to 1919.
 
Katydid was built as a civilian motorboat in 1912 by William Hoff at New Rochelle, New York. Anticipating the entry of the United States into World War I the following month, the U.S. Navy purchased her on 27 March 1917 from her owner, Arnold G. Dana, for use as a patrol boat. Assigned to the 3rd Naval District on 4 April 1917, she was commissioned on 10 May 1917 as USS Katydid (SP-95).

In 1917, Katydid operated in New York Harbor and nearby waters serving as launch to the training ship  and troop transport USS President Grant (ID-3014). Subsequently, she deployed to France.

Katydid was laid up on 9 December 1919. She was transferred to the United States Department of War on 18 February 1920 for service with the United States Army Ordnance Department at Neville Island, Pennsylvania.

References

1912 ships
Patrol vessels of the United States Navy
World War I patrol vessels of the United States
Ships built in New York (state)